Clostridium chartatabidum is a strictly anaerobic and spore-forming bacterium from the genus Clostridium which has been isolated from an ovine rumen in New Zealand.

References

 

Bacteria described in 1996
chartatabidum